Milleropsis is an extinct genus of millerettid parareptile from the Late Permian (Changhsingian stage) of South Africa.

References

Parareptiles
Permian reptiles of Africa
Prehistoric reptile genera